Jewels  is a compilation album by the British rock band Queen, released on 28 January 2004. The album was released only in Japan on CD. 
It's a Japan only 24 bit digitally remastered compilation CD featuring extensive liner notes in Japanese and obi-strip.

It was released alongside a DVD that bears the same name, which includes the official videos of the songs that make up the album plus two bonus tracks.

On 26 January 2005 was released the album Jewels II in CD format, also only in Japan. To complete the collection, on September 30, 2005, Jewels I & II: Japan Tour 2005 Special Edition was launched to promote the Queen + Paul Rodgers Tour in that country. It includes a CD with all the songs of Jewels and Jewels II, and an extra CD with two live videos of the concert of Queen in the Milton Keynes Bowl the 5 of June 1982.

Track listing

Jewels (DVD)
 "I Was Born To Love You (2004 Video)"
 "We Will Rock You"
 "We Are The Champions"
 "Don't Stop Me Now"
 "Too Much Love Will Kill You"
 "You're My Best Friend"
 "Under Pressure"
 "Radio Ga Ga"
 "Somebody To Love"
 "Killer Queen"
 "Another One Bites The Dust"
 "Crazy Little Thing Called Love"
 "Flash"
 "The Show Must Go On"
 "Bohemian Rhapsody"
 "I'm Going Slightly Mad" (Bonus Track)
 "Let Me Live (Photo Gallery)" (Bonus Tack)

Accolades 
{| class="wikitable plainrowheaders"
|-
! Year
! Organization
! Award
! Result
! Ref.
|-
! scope="row" | 2005
| Japan Gold Disc Award
| Rock and Pop Album of the Year (Western)
| 
| style="text-align:center;"|

Charts and certifications

Weekly charts

Year-end charts

Certifications

References 

2004 compilation albums
Queen (band) compilation albums